Continue is the second studio album by American rapper Wax, released on January 15, 2013.

Track listing

Charts

References

2013 albums